Kom Firin is an archaeological site in Egypt, located in the southwestern border of the Nile Delta, just west of Kom el-Hisn. Most of the archaeological informations regarding the site were obtained from the 2002–2010 excavation campaign organized by the British Museum and led by Neal Spencer.

History
Earliest attestations of Kom Firin date back to the reign of Ramesses II of the 19th Dynasty, and it appears most likely that it was founded during this period as a fortified town against Libyan incursions from the western border of Egypt. Its original Egyptian name has not been discovered yet.
A large (225 x 199 m), enclosure was unearthed in the eastern part of the site, and it is believed to be the remain of a fortified Ramesside temple. During the Late Period the town underwent a significant remodelling and expansion, and so did the older New Kingdom enclosure, now surrounding a quadrupled area. Kom Firin's necropolis was possibly located in the nearby site of Silvagou.

In later times, Kom Firin was progressively demolished by sebakh diggers. A prominent, modern feature of the site is the presence of pillars and pinnacles made of mudbricks, and up to 10 m high, which are the result of the combined action of weather and sebakh–digging on the ancient enclosure and buildings.

References

Further reading
Basta, Mounir (1979) "Excavations West of Kôm Firin (1966-1967)." Chronique d'Égypte 54 (108): 183–96.
Spencer, Neal (2008) Kom Firin I: the Ramesside temple and the site survey. London: British Museum.
Spencer, Neal (2014) Kom Firin II: The urban fabric and landscape. London: British Museum.

External links
The British Museum – Kom Firin, Egypt

Archaeological sites in Egypt
Nile Delta
Cities in ancient Egypt
Tells (archaeology)